Shakeela is a 2020 an Indian Hindi-language biographical film written and directed by Indrajit Lankesh. The film stars Richa Chadda as the eponymous adult star of 1990s who acted in adult films in several Indian languages, with Pankaj Tripathi and Rajeev Pillai in supporting roles. The film has been produced by Sammy Nanwani and Sahil Nanwani. Shakeela released on 25 December 2020 in theatres.

Cast
 Richa Chadda as Shakeela
 Pankaj Tripathi as Superstar Salim
 Rajeev Pillai as Arjun
 Ester Noronha as Suhana
 Kajol Chugh as Young Shakeela
 Sheeva Rana as Silk Smitha
 Ahaana Kochar as Ahaana
 Suchendra Prasad as si aarumugam
 Valerian Menezes as a director of Salim

Production

Lankesh started working on the film in 2019. Richa Chadda said in an interview that she came to know many lesser known facts about Shakeela like she hired a body double to do her scenes. Though the posters and few glimpses were out in 2018 and 2019 by Shakeela team.

Release 
The film released on 25 December 2020 (on Christmas) in four languages : Kannada, Hindi, Telugu, Tamil, Malayalam languages. The box office collections of the film was affected by piracy after HD version with subtitles was leaked online on torrent sites, the leak was traced to someone in the Middle East.

Soundtrack

The songs are composed by Veer Samarth and Meet Bros. The lyrics are written by Kumaar in Hindi, Rajeev Alunkal, Saheb Khan and Dhanasekar in Malayalam, Rajesh Malarvannan in Tamil, Rajshri Sudhakar in Telugu. Jayanth Kaikini, Veeresh MP and Krishna Ritti in Kannada.

Track list Hindi (original)

Track list Malayalam

Track list Tamil

Track list Telugu

Track list Kannada

References

External links
 
 Shakeela on Bollywood Hungama

2020s Hindi-language films
2020 films
2020 biographical drama films
Films about women in India
Indian biographical drama films
Films about pornography
Films directed by Indrajit Lankesh